Daniela Gustin (born 11 May 1994) is a Swedish former handball player, who last played for SønderjyskE Håndbold and the Swedish national team.

Personal life
She is engaged to handballer Hampus Wanne.

References

1994 births
Living people
Swedish female handball players
Expatriate handball players
Swedish expatriate sportspeople in Denmark
Swedish expatriate sportspeople in Germany
21st-century Swedish women